Anne McAneney is a Northern Irish trumpet player and professor at the Guildhall School of Music and Drama. She became the first woman to hold a principal trumpet position in a UK orchestra at Sadlers Wells Royal Ballet Orchestra in 1984. She is currently sub-principal Trumpet in the London Philharmonic Orchestra.

Education 
Anne grew up in Belfast, NI, and originally studied piano and violin. She recalls:I then struggled with the violin for many years, until the school brass band offered me a cornet to join their ranks. I found this considerably easier to play and really enjoyed being in the band, but ultimately changed to the trumpet in order to play orchestral music."From 1979 to 1982, Anne studied BMus (Hons) trumpet at Goldsmiths, University of London. Thereafter, she completed a Certificate of Advanced Musical Studies: Orchestra Training from the Guildhall School of Music and Drama and a master's degree in music at the University of Reading. Reflecting on brass playing and gender in 2018, Anne said:"Historically, only the violin, flute and piano were considered to be feminine,"

"Colliery bands were male, and it took a long time for women to get involved in those. Back when I started in the mid-1980s, I was definitely a rarity. But things are changing. I have been teaching at the Guildhall School of Music for 23 years and during that time there has been a huge increase not just in trumpet players but right across the board.

"But change doesn't happen overnight if something has been a great male tradition. Some orchestras now have screened [blind] auditions, although at the London Philharmonic we don't, because people can feel that if they are seen to be a woman, they won't get through no matter how well they play."

Professional life

Freelancer & Royal Ballet Orchestra 
Anne started as a freelance musician. She has played in the Vienna Musikverein, Berlin Philharmonie, Cologne Philharmonie, Carnegie Hall, Amsterdam Concertgebouw, with conductors such as Yuri Termikanov, Claus Tennstedt, Bernard Haitink and Kurt Masur. In 1984 she was appointed Principal Trumpet of the Royal Ballet Orchestra, making her the first woman to hold a principal trumpet chair in the UK. Anne has also presented on BBC Radio 3.

London Brass 
McAneney spent a 23-year tenure with the UK's premier brass ensemble, London Brass. After the group's founder, Philip Jones, retired, she took over his trumpet and flugelhorn position. This involved "quite a few hours in an audition with the Philip Jones Quintet, replacing Rod Franks and Nigel Gomm in turn."

London Philharmonic Orchestra 
Since 2000, she has been sub-principal trumpet at the London Philharmonic Orchestra, and was a director of the orchestra board from 2005 until 2011. With the orchestra, Anne has been a flugelhorn soloist in Vaughan Williams' Symphony No. 9, recorded for major films such as The Lord of the Rings and toured extensively around the world.

Education & Community Projects 
Anne has been involved with the LPO's Education & Community projects for more than 20 years. Anne emphasises the importance of such projects in the LPO's Tune In Newsletter: I think it is very important to share music with as many people as possible, and I love to see the sheer pleasure on someone's face who is taking part in music-making for the first time. For the last few years I've taken part in projects for people with special needs and disabilities. in the OrchLab project we work together with Drake Music, who have developed instruments using technology such as iPads, soundbeams and switches with pre-recorded musical clips. We make music, sing and compose together, telling stories through the music. To see someone who is quadriplegic gain confidence in using the technology and by using just their chin or head movement find a means to express their inner music and feelings is indeed very rewarding.

BrassWorks 
Anne runs the publishing company BrassWorks with her husband, which sells arrangements and study books.

Former Pupils 

 James Fountain, joint Principal Trumpet of the London Philharhmonic Orchestra, former Principal Trumpet of the Royal Philharmonic Orchestra
 Phillip Cobb, Principal Trumpet of the BBC Symphony Orchestra, former principal of the London Symphony Orchestra
 Katie Smith,  LPO (extra), RPO, BBC SO, Royal Ballet Sinfonia, Britten Pears Orchestra
 Kaitlin Wild, LSO, BBC SO (extra), CBSO (extra), Royal Philharmonic Concert Orchestra
 Darren Moore, Chamber Orchestra of Europe, LPO, ENO, Hanover Band, English Baroque Soloists, His Majesty's Sagbutts and Cornetts,

Selected Discography

References 

Living people
Academics of the Guildhall School of Music and Drama
Musicians from Belfast
Year of birth missing (living people)